Forest Park or Vorst Park is a public park located in and named after the municipality of Forest in Brussels, Belgium.

Forest Park is adjacent to Duden Park to its south, which is home to the football ground of Royale Union Saint-Gilloise, the historical football club from the neighbouring municipality of Saint-Gilles, although the club is not located in the municipality, whose border with Forest is to the north of Forest Park. 

The park is surrounded by a set of streets which connect the / with the /, making them part of the Greater Ring. Those streets are the / to the north, the / to the east, the / to the south and the / to the south-west.

See also

 List of parks and gardens in Brussels

References

Notes

Parks in Brussels
Urban public parks
Forest, Belgium